Selva di Cadore is a comune (municipality) in the province of Belluno in the Italian region of Veneto, located about  north of Venice and about  northwest of Belluno. The population speaks a Venetian dialect called Ladin Venetian that is heavily influenced by the Ladin language.

The municipality of Selva di Cadore contains the frazioni (subdivisions, mainly villages and hamlets) S.Fosca and Pescul.

Selva di Cadore borders the following municipalities: Alleghe, Borca di Cadore, Colle Santa Lucia, San Vito di Cadore, Zoldo Alto.

Demographic evolution

References 

Cities and towns in Veneto